Roland Losert (born 6 January 1945) is a retired Austrian fencer who won the world title in épée in 1963. He also won junior world titles in épée (1963) and foil (1964 and 1965). Losert competed at the 1964, 1968 and 1972 Summer Olympics in the individual foil and individual and team épée events (nine in total). His best achievement was fourth place in the foil in 1964.

His father Josef and sister Ingrid were also successful fencers.

References

1945 births
Living people
Austrian male fencers
Austrian épée fencers
Olympic fencers of Austria
Fencers at the 1964 Summer Olympics
Fencers at the 1968 Summer Olympics
Fencers at the 1972 Summer Olympics
Fencers from Vienna
Universiade medalists in fencing
Universiade bronze medalists for Austria
Medalists at the 1967 Summer Universiade